John Greenway (1529) was a wealthy wool merchant of Tiverton in Devon who is chiefly remembered for his surviving building works in that town, namely the Greenway Chapel and the Greenway Porch (both 1517) in St Peter's Church, and the Greenway Almshouse (1517) in Gold Street. He was a member of the Company of Merchant Adventurers of London and of the Worshipful Company of Drapers, the arms of which Companies adorn the Greenway Chapel. He is one of the Worthies of Devon of the Devonshire biographer John Prince (1643–1723).

Origins
Greenway was born in Tiverton "of very mean parentage". Prince discovered no information concerning his ancestry but speculated that he was possibly descended from the Greenway family of Greenway in the parish of Brixham near Dartmouth, Devon, which family died out in the male line leaving a sole heiress Joan Greenway who became the wife of one of the "knightly family" of Gilbert of Compton Castle, which marriage is not however recorded in the Gilbert pedigree in the Heraldic Visitations of Devon up to 1620. Prince concluded that in his case ancestry was not "much material, a worthy man carries honor about him whatever his descent be".

Career

Prince states that "by the blessing of God and a diligent hand he grew vastly rich". His main business was the very profitable trade of importing Irish wool into England.

Death and burial
He died in 1529 and was buried in the "Greenway Chapel" which he had built against the southern wall of St Peter's Church in Tiverton.

Further reading
Welsford, Anne E. John Greenway 1460-1529 Merchant of Tiverton and London, A Devon Worthy, Tiverton, 1984
Harding, Lt-Col. The History of Tiverton in the County of Devon; Vol. I.  Tiverton, 1845
Historical Memoirs etc., Book I, General History and Remarkable Occurrences, p. 272-3  for drawing of Greenway's merchant mark. Arms, book 4, p. 5 ; book 4, p. 7, footnote, re resemblance of Drapers arms to papal tiaras; Greenway Almshouses, pp. 77-

Sources
Prince, John, (1643–1723) The Worthies of Devon, 1810 edition, London, pp. 438–9, Greenway, John
Goodall, John, Parish Church Treasures: The Nation's Greatest Art Collection, Chapter 68: The Church of St Peter, Tiverton, Devon, pp. 119–120 Google books

References

1460 births
1529 deaths
16th-century English landowners
History of Devon
Businesspeople from Tiverton, Devon